Norma Amezcua Guajardo (born 14 August 1953) is a Mexican former butterfly, freestyle and medley swimmer. She competed at the 1968 Summer Olympics and the 1972 Summer Olympics.

References

External links
 

1953 births
Living people
Mexican female butterfly swimmers
Mexican female freestyle swimmers
Mexican female medley swimmers
Olympic swimmers of Mexico
Swimmers at the 1968 Summer Olympics
Swimmers at the 1972 Summer Olympics
Swimmers from Mexico City
Swimmers at the 1971 Pan American Games
Pan American Games medalists in swimming
Pan American Games bronze medalists for Mexico
Central American and Caribbean Games gold medalists for Mexico
Central American and Caribbean Games medalists in swimming
Competitors at the 1970 Central American and Caribbean Games
Medalists at the 1971 Pan American Games
20th-century Mexican women
21st-century Mexican women